Kenneth Wayne Hedberg (February 2, 1920 – January 5, 2019) was an American chemist.

Early life 
Hedberg was born on February 2, 1920, to parents Gustave and Ruth. As a child, he lived in Portland, Oregon and Hoquiam, Washington. Hedberg completed high school in Medford, Oregon. Upon graduating from Oregon State University, Hedberg worked for Shell Development Company. After World War II ended, Hedberg returned to school, obtaining a doctorate at California Institute of Technology in 1948, under Linus Pauling and Verner Shoemaker. Hedberg was awarded a Fulbright Scholarship and Guggenheim Fellowship. While researching in Norway, Hedberg met and Lise Smedvik - later Lise Hedberg. The two returned to the United States in 1956 and joined the Oregon State faculty. Some of Hedberg's later research was funded by a Sloan Fellowship. He taught at Oregon State until 1987. Over the course of his career, Hedberg was elected a fellow of the American Physical Society and the American Association for the Advancement of Science. He was also elected to membership within the Norwegian Academy of Science and Letters and awarded an honorary doctorate from the Norwegian University of Science and Technology. Hedberg died on January 5, 2019, aged 98.

References

1920 births
2019 deaths
20th-century American chemists
American physical chemists
Scientists from Portland, Oregon
Oregon State University faculty
Oregon State University alumni
California Institute of Technology alumni
Sloan Research Fellows
Fellows of the American Physical Society
Members of the Norwegian Academy of Science and Letters
Fellows of the American Association for the Advancement of Science
Fulbright alumni